Kutabpur, a village in Nadia district (West Bengal), situated to the south of the Western bank of the river Bhairab,  where the indigo godown was once built. Year back, the English merchants were engaged in the trade of indigo on the banks of Bhairab. Although the village is inhabited by people of all castes and devoted themselves to the worship of deities, Mitra and Mansa.

Religious personality Swami Nigamananda having been born in this village had shown the world, the path of Gyana(ज्ञान)-Shankara and Prema( प्रेम) -Gouranga.

References

Villages in Nadia district